Haverhill is the name of different places around the world:

United Kingdom
Haverhill, Suffolk, England

United States
 Haverhill, Florida, city in Florida, United States.
 Haverhill, Iowa, city in Iowa, United States.
 Haverhill, Kansas, city in Kansas, United States.
 Haverhill, Massachusetts, city in Massachusetts, United States.
 Haverhill station (Massachusetts), railroad station served by Amtrak and the MBTA.
 Haverhill Line, MBTA commuter rail system
 Haverhill, New Hampshire, city in New Hampshire, United States.
 Haverhill, Ohio, city in Ohio, United States
 Haverhill Township, Olmsted County, Minnesota
 Haverhill station, a railroad location in Marion Township, Olmsted County, Minnesota previously named for Chester, Minnesota, but renamed by the railroad to avoid confusion with Rochester, Minnesota.

Other uses
Haverhill station (disambiguation), stations of the name